Phillips Exeter Academy (often called Exeter or PEA) is a highly selective, coeducational independent school for boarding and day students in grades 9 through 12, and offers a secondary postgraduate program. Located in Exeter, New Hampshire, it is one of the oldest secondary schools in the United States and among its most prestigious.

Exeter is based on the Harkness education system, a conference format of student interaction with minimal teacher involvement. It has the largest endowment of any New England boarding school, which as of 2018 was valued at $1.3 billion. On January 25, 2019, William K. Rawson was appointed by the academy's trustees as the 16th Principal Instructor. He is the 4th alumnus of Exeter to serve as Principal Instructor, after Gideon Lane Soule (1838–1873), Harlan Amen (1895–1913), and William Saltonstall (1946–1963).

Phillips Exeter Academy has educated several generations of the New England establishment and prominent American politicians, but has introduced many programs to diversify the student population, including need-blind admission. In 2021, over 49% of students received financial aid from grants totaling over $25 million. The school has historically been among the most selective secondary schools in the world, with an acceptance rate of 11% for the 2020–2021 school year.  and approximately 30% of graduates attend an Ivy League university.

Management of the school's financial and physical resources is overseen by trustees drawn from alumni. Day-to-day operations are headed by a principal, who is appointed by the trustees. The faculty of the school are responsible for governing matters relating to student life, both in and out of the classroom.

The school's first enrolled class counted 56 boys; in 1970, when the decision was made to implement co-education, there were 700 boys. The 2018 academic year saw enrollment at 1,096 students, with 883 boarding students and 213 day students. The student body is roughly equally split between boys and girls, who are housed in 25 single-sex and two mixed-sex dormitories. Each residence is supervised by a dormitory head selected from the faculty.

History

Origins

Phillips Exeter Academy was established in Exeter, New Hampshire, in 1781 by Elizabeth and John Phillips. John Phillips had made his fortune as a merchant and banker before going into public service, and financially supported his nephew Samuel Phillips, Jr. in founding his own school, Phillips Academy, in Andover, Massachusetts, three years earlier. As a result of this family relationship, the two schools share a rivalry. The school that Phillips founded at Exeter was to educate students under a Calvinist religious framework. However, like his nephew who founded Andover, Phillips stipulated in the school's founding charter that it would "ever be equally open to youth of requisite qualifications from every quarter."

Phillips had previously been married to Sarah Gilman, wealthy widow of Phillips' cousin, merchant Nathaniel Gilman, whose large fortune, bequeathed to Phillips, enabled him to endow the academy. The Gilman family also donated to the academy much of the land on which it stands, including the initial 1793 grant by New Hampshire Governor John Taylor Gilman of the Yard, the oldest part of campus; the academy's first class in 1783 included seven Gilmans. In 1814, Nicholas Gilman, signer of the U.S. Constitution, left $1,000 to Exeter to teach "sacred music."

The academy's first schoolhouse, the First Academy Building, was built on a site on Tan Lane in 1783, and today stands not far from its original location. The building was dedicated on February 20, 1783, the same day that the school's first Preceptor, William Woodbridge, was chosen by John Phillips.

Exeter's Deed of Gift, written by John Phillips at the founding of the school, states that Exeter's mission is to instill in its students both goodness and knowledge:
Exeter participated in the Chinese Educational Mission, hosting seven students from Qing China, starting in 1879. They were sent to learn about western technology, and attended Exeter among other schools to prepare for college. However, all students were recalled after just 2 years (in 1881) due to mounting tensions between the United States and China, as well as growing concern that the students were becoming Americanized.

Harkness gift

On April 9, 1930, philanthropist and oil magnate Edward Harkness wrote to Exeter Principal Lewis Perry regarding how a substantial donation that Harkness would make to the academy might be used to fund a new way of teaching and learning:

The result was "Harkness teaching", in which a teacher and a group of students work together, exchanging ideas and information, similar to the Socratic method.  In November 1930, Harkness gave Exeter $5.8 million to support this initiative. Since then, the academy's principal mode of instruction has been by discussion, "seminar style," around an oval table known as the Harkness table.  Today at Phillips Exeter Academy, all classes are taught using this method, with no more than 12 or 13 students per class.

This informality was for many decades reflected in the school's "unwritten code that there were no rules at the academy until you broke one." Expelled alumni include the journalist David Lamb and the writer and editor George Plimpton.

Recent history 
The academy became coeducational in 1970 when 39 girls began attending. In 1996, to reflect the academy's coeducational status, a new gender-inclusive Latin inscription Hic Quaerite Pueri Puellaeque Virtutem et Scientiam ("Here, boys and girls, seek goodness and knowledge") was added over the main entrance to the Academy Building.  This new inscription augments the original one—Huc Venite, Pueri, ut Viri Sitis ("Come hither boys so that ye may become men").

Academics
Exeter uses an 11-point grading system, in which an A is worth 11 points and an E is worth 0 points. Exeter has a student-to-teacher ratio of about 5:1. A majority of the faculty have advanced degrees in their fields. Students who attend Exeter for four years are required to take courses in the arts, classical or modern languages, computer science, English, health & human development, history, mathematics, religion, and science. Most students receive an English diploma, but students who take the full series of Latin and Ancient Greek classes receive a Classical diploma.

Harkness teaching method
Most classes at Exeter are taught around Harkness tables. No classrooms have rows of chairs, and lectures are rare. The completion of the Phelps Science Center in 2001 enabled all science classes, which previously had been taught in more conventional classrooms, to be conducted around the same Harkness tables. Elements of the Harkness method, including the Harkness table, are now used in schools around the world.

Notable faculty

 Founder of the Religion department Frederick Buechner, minister and author
 Instructor in History Michael Golay, historian and author
 Instructor in English Todd Hearon, poet
 Instructor in English Willie Perdomo, poet and children's book author
 Instructor in Mathematics Zuming Feng, U.S. International Mathematical Olympiad Program team coach from 1997 to 2013
 Instructor in Mathematics Gwynneth Coogan, Olympic athlete
 Instructor in Music Marilinda Garcia, former member of the New Hampshire House of Representatives and harp player

Off-campus study
During the tenure of Exeter's tenth principal, Richard W. Day, the Washington Intern Program and the Foreign Studies Program began. Exeter offers the Washington Intern Program, where students intern in the office of a senator or congressional representative. Exeter also participates in the Milton Academy Mountain School program, which allows students to study in a small rural setting in Vershire, Vermont. The academy currently sponsors trimester-long foreign study programs in Grenoble, Tema, Tokyo, Saint Petersburg, Stratford-upon-Avon, Eleuthera, Taichung, Göttingen, Rome, Cuenca, and Callan; as well as school-year abroad programs in Beijing, Rennes, Viterbo, and Zaragoza. The academy also offers foreign language summer programs in France, Japan, Spain, and Taiwan.

Numbers
For the 313 members of the class of 2018, the average SAT (Scholastic Aptitude Test) was 700 verbal, 740 math.

Between 2016 and 2018, 15 or more students matriculated at the following colleges and universities: Brown, Carnegie Mellon, Columbia, Dartmouth, Georgetown, Harvard, MIT, Princeton, Trinity College, Tufts, Michigan, UPenn, Williams, and Yale.

Student body

For the 2019–20 school year, the Exeter student body included students from 44 states, the District of Columbia, Puerto Rico, and 31 countries. Students of color comprise 52.4% of the student body (Asian 29.5%, Black 11.5%, Hispanic/Latino 9.0%, Native American 1.5%, multiracial 0.6%, Pacific Islander 0.3%). Legacy students account for 13% of the students. Of new students entering in 2019 (a total of 314), 52% attended public school and 48% attended private, parochial, military, home, or foreign schools.

Most Exeter students—80 percent—live on campus in dormitories or houses. The remaining 19 percent of the student body are day students from the surrounding communities.

The academy uses a unique designation for its grade levels. Entering first-year students are called Juniors (nicknamed "preps"), second-year students are Lower Middlers ("lowers"), third-year students are Upper Middlers ("uppers"), and fourth-year students are seniors. Exeter also admits postgraduate students ("PGs").

Finances

Tuition and financial aid
Tuition for boarding students in 2018-19 was $55,000, plus other mandatory and optional fees.

Exeter offers need-based financial aid. For families with incomes less than $75,000, Exeter is free. Partial assistance is available for families with incomes up to $200,000. Admissions are currently need-blind. In 2018, approximately 50 percent of students received a total of $21 million in financial assistance.

Endowment
Exeter's endowment as of June 30, 2017, was valued at $1.3 billion. This is the third-highest endowment of any American secondary school, behind the $11.0 billion endowment of Kamehameha Schools in Hawaii, and the $13.7 billion of the Milton Hershey School in Pennsylvania.  Phillips Exeter Academy's operational budget was $107 million as of 2018.

Campus facilities

Academic facilities
 The Academy Building is the fourth such building. It was built in 1914 after a devastating fire ruined the third. The Academy Building was designed by Ralph Adams Cram of Cram, Goodhue & Ferguson, and houses the History, Math, Religion and Classical Languages departments, along with a small but significant archaeology/anthropology museum. Two wings were added to the original structure in the 1920s and 1930s during a building boom that was orchestrated by Principal Lewis Perry. One of these wings is the Mayer Art Center, which, despite being attached to the Academy Building, is often referred to as a separate building. The Academy Building also houses the Assembly Hall (formerly known as the Chapel). In former times, non-denominational, Christian religious services were conducted in the Chapel every morning Monday through Saturday before the beginning of classes, and attendance was mandatory for all students in keeping with the wishes of the founders of the academy. The bell (visible in the photo of the Academy Building tower) was rung in a succession of rings to call the student body to worship: Ones, Twos, Threes, Fours, and Fives. After Fives were rung, monitors would begin walking down the rows checking attendance on the benches. The bell continues to be rung to mark the end of classes, as well as to mark each hour from 8 AM to 11 PM.
 The Class of 1945 Library, a famous modern library designed by Louis Kahn. The library has a shelf capacity of 250,000 volumes, and as of 2009 housed 162,000 volumes. This library is the largest secondary-school library in the world. When it opened, Ada Louise Huxtable, architecture critic for The New York Times, hailed the Exeter library as a "serene, distinguished structure of considerable beauty." She said that the library's central space "breaks on the viewer with breathtaking drama." The headline of her review called the Exeter library a "stunning paean to books."
Elizabeth Phillips Academy Center (or "EPAC") is the student center of the campus. It houses the Phelps Commons, the McLane Post Office, the Day Student Lounge, the Forum (a 300-person auditorium), the Academic Support Center, and a grill. It also plays host to a number of student organizations such as The Exonian, WPEA, and the Exeter Student Service Organization (ESSO). The building was originally opened in 2006 as the Phelps Academy Center, but the name was changed in the fall of 2018.
Goel Center for Theater and Dance was opened in 2018. It houses DRAMAT, the student led drama club at Exeter. It is named for David Goel and Stacey Goel.
 Phillips Hall is home to the English and Modern Languages departments. On the first floor of Phillips Hall is the Elting Room (where the faculty meets). Phillips Hall was built in 1932 during the tenure of Principal Lewis Perry. The Harkness gift funded the building, and its classrooms were designed for the Harkness tables.
 Phelps Science Center was designed by Centerbrook Architects & Planners, and was built in 2001. The center provides laboratory and classroom space. In 2004, it received the American Institute of Architects New Hampshire's Honor Award for Excellence in Architecture.
 Forrestal Bowld Music Center houses the Music Department, the Music Library, three rehearsal halls, several faculty offices, and dozens of rehearsal rooms. It was built in 1995, and was awarded the Honor Award in Architecture Design by the Boston Society of Architects in 1996. The facility was extended recently and includes a recital hall.
 Mayer Art Center is home to the Art Department and the Lamont Gallery, as well as the College Counseling Office. It was constructed in 1903 as Alumni Hall. It contains a large ceramics studio with approximately twenty wheels and three kilns on the first floor, two printmaking studios and three drawing/painting studios on the second floor, and an architectural and 3-D design studio on the third floor. It also has a 3-D printer, which was added in 2013.

Athletic facilities
 The George H. Love Gymnasium was built in 1969, and is named for George H. Love (1917). It houses squash facilities with 10 international sized courts, one swimming pool, three basketball courts, a weight-training room, a sports-science lab, gym offices, two hockey rinks, locker rooms, and visiting team locker rooms.
 The Thompson Gymnasium was built in 1918, replacing the old gym which was demolished in 1922, and was a gift of Colonel William Boyce Thompson (1890). It has a basketball court, a dance studio, visiting team locker rooms, a cycling training room, a second swimming pool and a media room.
 The Thompson Cage was built in 1931 and was also a gift of Colonel Thompson. It is an indoor cage with two tracks; one has a wooden surface and the other a dirt surface. The open dirt-surfaced floor is a multipurpose area. A wrestling room and gymnastics space are attached. In 2015, Academy Trustees approved the removal of the Cage and the construction of a new field house in its footprint.
 The Thompson Fieldhouse was opened in 2018 on the grounds of the former Thompson Cage. It is an  facility connected to the Love and Thompson Gymnasiums, housing four indoor tennis courts, two batting cages, a wrestling room, and an indoor track.
 Ralph Lovshin Track is an outdoor all-weather  track named for the long-serving track coach Ralph Lovshin.
 The Plimpton Playing Fields are used for various outdoor sports. They are named in honor of alumnus and trustee George Arthur Plimpton (1873).
 Phelps Stadium is used for football, soccer, lacrosse and field hockey. It was converted into turf surface in 2006.
 The William G. Saltonstall Boathouse was built in 1990, and is the center of crew on campus, on the Squamscott River. It is named for the academy's ninth principal.
 Amos Alonzo Stagg Baseball Diamond was named after alumnus Amos Alonzo Stagg.
 Hilliard Lacrosse Field
 Roger Nekton Championship Pool is named for the long-serving former swimming and water polo coach.
 The Downer Family Fitness Center was built in 2015 guided by a donation from its namesake, the Downer family. It features many weight lifting resources, aerobic machines, and turf space.
 19 outdoor tennis courts
 Several miles of cross-country and running trails
 Wrestling practice room

Other facilities

 Phillips Church was originally built as the Second Parish Church in 1897 and was purchased by the academy in 1922. The building was designed by Ralph Adams Cram. Although originally a church, the building now contains spaces for students of many faiths.  It includes a Hindu shrine, a Muslim prayer room and ablutions fountain, a kosher kitchen, and a meditation room.  Services that are particular to Phillips Church include Evening Prayer on Tuesday nights, Thursday Meditation, and Indaba—a religious open forum.
 Nathaniel Gilman House was built in 1740. The Gilman House is a large colonial white clapboard home with a gambrel roof hipped at one end, a leaded fanlight over the front door and a wide panelled entry hall. This home, as well as the Benjamin Clark Gilman House which is also owned by the academy, were built for members of Exeter's Gilman family, who donated the Nathaniel Gilman House to the academy in 1905. The home now houses the academy's Alumni and Alumnae Affairs and Development Office.
 The Davis Center was designed by Ralph Adams Cram as the Davis Library. Today it houses the financial aid offices as well as the dance studio.

Athletics
Exeter offers 65 interscholastic sports teams at the varsity and junior varsity level, 27 intramural sports teams, and various fitness classes. All students are required to participate in athletics. 

Water polo, wrestling, swimming, cycling, soccer, squash, cross country, crew, and ice hockey teams have won recent New England championships.

Exeter has graduated multiple elite athletes in the past few decades. For example, crew Olympians include Anne Marden '76, Rajanya Shah '92, Sabrina Kolker '98, and Andréanne Morin '02. Georgia Gould is an Olympic medalist in mountain biking, while Joy Fahrenkrog is a member of the United States Archery Team. Duncan Robinson plays for the Miami Heat in the National Basketball Association. Tom Cavanagh played in the National Hockey League. Sam Fuld played 8 years of Major League Baseball, and became the General Manager of the Philadelphia Phillies in 2020.

Exeter's main rival is Phillips Academy Andover. The two schools have been competing against each other in both baseball and football since 1878 (in those first games, Exeter defeated Andover 12–0 in baseball, while Andover won the football game, 22-0). Today, Exeter-Andover weekend is still a large tradition in both schools.

Other athletic opponents include a variety of New England private schools such as Belmont Hill School, Berwick Academy, Deerfield Academy, Northfield Mount Hermon, Brewster Academy, Choate Rosemary Hall, Groton School, The Governor's Academy, Loomis Chaffee, Tabor Academy, Milton Academy, Avon Old Farms, Worcester Academy, Cushing Academy, and various other northeastern prep and boarding schools.

Student life
Exeter had a gendered dress code until June 2015. Boys were required to wear collared shirts and ties or turtlenecks. Girls were required to wear non-revealing, appropriate attire. Skirts and shorts must reach finger-tip length, and straps may not be less than two fingers wide.  Jeans were allowed for boys and girls; however, "hoodies," graphic T-shirts, and athletic wear are not permitted. The new dress code is gender neutral, and no longer requires ties. Dress code is required only in the classroom setting and Assembly.

The academy has over 100 clubs listed. The number of functioning and reputable clubs fluctuates; several of the listed clubs on the website do not hold tables on Club Night. The Exonian is the school's weekly newspaper. It is the oldest continuously running preparatory school newspaper in the United States, having begun publishing in 1878. Recently, The Exonian began online publication. The Exonian has been a finalist for a National Pacemaker Award several times, winning in 2007. Other long-established clubs include ESSO, which focuses on social service outreach, and the PEAN, which is the academy's yearbook. Exeter also has the oldest surviving secondary school society, the Golden Branch (founded in 1818), a society for public speaking, inspired by PEA's Rhetorical Society of 1807–1820. Now known as the Daniel Webster Debate Society, these groups served as America's first secondary school organization for oratory. The Model UN club has won the "Best Small Delegation" award at HMUN. Exeter's Mock Trial Association, founded by attorney and historian Walter Stahr, has since 2011 claimed seventeen individual titles, five all-around state titles, and a top-ten spot at the National High School Mock Trial Championship.

Close to 80% of students live in the dormitories, with the other 20% commuting from homes within a  radius. Each residence hall has several faculty members and senior student proctors. There are check-in hours of 8:00 pm (for first- and second-year students), 9:00pm (for third years), and 10:00 pm (for seniors) during the weekdays and 11:00 pm on Saturday night.

Religious life on campus is supported by the Religious Services Department, which provides a vintage stone chapel and a full-service ministry for the spiritual needs of students. The chapel was originally built in 1895 and has been updated. It accommodates worship for "twelve religious traditions including Christian, Muslim, Jewish, Hindu, Quaker, Buddhist, Catholic among others" as well as Secular Humanism.

Weekly attendance at the religious service of their choice was required of students until 1969, after which religion at Exeter languished until it was revived by a new approach "as concerned with the religious dimension of all of our lives as it is with the particular religious needs of any one of us." A renovation of Phillips Church, completed in 2002, provided spaces for worship and meditation for students of diverse religious persuasions.

Sexual misconduct
Exeter has struggled to deal effectively with multiple incidents in which students were sexually abused by faculty and staff.

An incident of sexual misconduct that occurred in the basement of the church in late 2015 first brought criticism to the school.

A more in-depth investigation by an outside law firm uncovered sexual misconduct that occurred at Exeter since the 1970s and involved at least 11 members of the faculty and staff. The report harshly criticized the school for not supporting the victims when they reported the incidents and for a pattern of not including these allegations in the faculty members' files. In April 2016, Exeter hired a law firm of Holland & Knight LLP to investigate allegations of past misconduct by Exeter faculty and staff. A report was released in August 2018 providing an overview of the investigation and the findings of Holland & Knight LLP. 

Through this process, Holland & Knight was assigned and completed 28 investigations. Of those 28 matters, 26 involved reported misconduct of a sexual nature by an Exeter faculty or staff member towards an Exeter student occurring at various points spanning from the 1950s to the 2010s. During the course of these 28 investigations, Holland & Knight conducted approximately 294 interviews of over 170 individuals.  The persons interviewed were located in various states, as well as in multiple countries. According to the findings, the school maintained two sets of files, and would keep the more sensitive material away from Human Resources and prospective employers. Some of these faculty members would then leave Exeter but get hired at peer schools. In at least one case, the teacher then molested students at their next school. The allegations involve staffers who have since been fired, left the school or have died. Several have been named in the past by the school. In a letter, Exeter officials apologized to the school community, including victims who have come forward and those who have remained silent.

Emblems

Academy seal
Exeter has two chief symbols: a seal depicting a river, sun and beehive, incorporating the academy's mottos; and the Lion Rampant. The seal has similarities to that used by Phillips Academy—an emblem designed by Paul Revere—and its imagery is Masonic in nature. A beehive often represented the industry and cooperation of a lodge or, in this case, the studies and united efforts of Academy students. The Lion Rampant is derived from the Phillips family's coat of arms, and suggests that all of the academy's alumni are part of the "Exonian family".

Exeter has three mottoes on the academy seal: Non Sibi (Latin 'Not for oneself') indicating a life based on community and duty; Finis origine pendet (Latin 'The end depends on the beginning') reflecting Exeter's emphasis on hard work as preparation for a fruitful adult life; and Χάριτι Θεοῦ (Greek 'By the grace of God') reflecting Exeter's Calvinist origins, of which the only remnant today is the school's requirement that most students take two courses in religion or philosophy.

School colors and the alumnus tie
There are several variants of school colors associated with Phillips Exeter Academy that range from crimson red and white to burgundy red and silver. Black is also a color associated with the school to a lesser extent. The official school colors are lively maroon and gray. The traditional school tie is a burgundy red tie with alternating diagonal silver stripes and silver lions rampant. The school’s athletic teams today wear the Pantone Matching System color PMS201.

Notable alumni

Early alumni of Exeter include US Senator Daniel Webster (1796); John Adams Dix (1809) a Secretary of the Treasury and Governor of New York; US President Franklin Pierce (1820); physician and founder of Sigma Pi Phi Henry McKee Minton (1851); Abraham Lincoln's son and 35th Secretary of War Robert Lincoln (1860); Ulysses S. Grant, Jr. (1870); Richard and Francis Cleveland; "grandfather of football" Amos Alonzo Stagg (1880); Pulitzer Prize-winning author Booth Tarkington (1889) and Hugo W. Koehler (1903), American naval spy during the Russian Revolution and step-father of United States Senator Claiborne Pell. John Knowles, author of A Separate Peace and Peace Breaks Out, was a 1945 graduate; both novels are set at the fictional Devon School, which serves as an analog for his alma mater.

Exeter alumni pursue careers in various fields. Other alumni noted for their work in government include Gifford Pinchot, Lewis Cass, Judd Gregg, Jay Rockefeller, Kent Conrad, John Negroponte, Bobby Shriver, Robert Bauer and Peter Orszag. Alumni notable for their military service include Secretary of Navy George Bancroft, Benjamin Butler, and Charles C. Krulak. Authors George Plimpton, John Knowles, Gore Vidal, John Irving (whose stepfather taught at Exeter), Robert Anderson, Dan Brown (whose father taught at Exeter), Peter Benchley, James Agee, Chang-Rae Lee, Debby Herbenick, Stewart Brand, Norb Vonnegut, Roland Merullo and Caroline Calloway also attended the academy.

Other notable alumni include businessmen Joseph Coors, Michael Lynton, Tom Steyer, Mark Zuckerberg, David Goel, and Stephen Mandel; lawyer Bradley Palmer; entrepreneur and presidential candidate Andrew Yang, journalist Drew Pearson, Dwight Macdonald, producer and entrepreneur Lauren Selig, James F. Hoge, Jr., Paul Klebnikov, Trish Regan, Suzy Welch, and Sarah Lyall; actors Michael Cerveris, Catherine Disher, Jack Gilpin, and Alessandro Nivola; film director Howard Hawks; musicians Phil Wilson, Bill Keith, Benmont Tench, China Forbes, Ketch Secor, Win Butler and William Butler; historians Robert Cowley, Arthur Schlesinger, Jr., and Brooks D. Simpson; writers Roxane Gay and Joyce Maynard; screenwriters Tom Whedon and Tom Mankiewicz; baseball players Robert Rolfe and Sam Fuld; educators Jared Sparks and Benno C. Schmidt, Jr.; composer Adam Guettel; musician and podcaster Hrishikesh Hirway, humorist Greg Daniels; mathematicians Shinichi Mochizuki, David Mumford, and Lloyd Shapley, winner of the 2012 Nobel Prize in economics; economist Paul Romer, winner of the 2018 Nobel Prize in economics, computer scientist Adam D'Angelo (co-founder of Quora); and philosopher and evolutionary biologist Daniel Dennett. Serial killer H.H. Holmes also attended the school.

Other academic programs

Summer school
Each summer, Phillips Exeter hosts over 780 students from various schools for a five-week program of academic study.  The summer program accommodates a diverse student body typically derived from over 40 different states and 45 foreign countries.

Exeter's summer school is divided into two programs of study: Upper School, which offers a wide variety of classes to students currently enrolled in high school who are entering grades ten through 12 as well as serving postgraduates; and Access Exeter, a program for students entering grades eight and nine, which offers accelerated study in the arts, sciences and writing as well as serving as an introduction to the school itself. Access Exeter curriculum consists of six academic clusters; each cluster consists of three courses organized around a focused central theme. Some of Exeter's summer school programs also give students the opportunity to experience studies outside of Exeter's campus environment, including interactions with other top schools and students, experience with Washington D.C., and travel abroad.

Workshops
The academy offers a number of workshops and conferences for secondary school educators. These include the Exeter Math Institute; the Exeter Humanities Institute; the Math, Science and Technology Conference; the Exeter Astronomy Conference; and the Shakespeare Conference.

The "On Beyond Exeter" program offers one-week seminars for alumni. Most courses are held at the academy, but some meet in the locations central to the course's topic.

Historical endeavors
In 1952, Exeter, Andover, Lawrenceville, Harvard, Princeton and Yale published the study General Education in School and College: A Committee Report. The report recommended examinations that would place students after admission to college. This program evolved into the Advanced Placement Program.

In 1965 Exeter became the second charter member (after Andover) of the School Year Abroad program. The program allows students to reside and study a foreign language abroad.

In popular culture

Several works are based on Exeter and portray the lives of its students. Many are written by alumni who disguise Exeter's name, but not its character, such as John Knowles and his novel A Separate Peace.

See also

Exeter point

Notes

References

Further reading

External links

 Phillips Exeter Academy
 Phillips Exeter Academy Crew
 Donald Hall talking about Phillips Exeter Academy. Archived at Ghostarchive on 2021-12-30. Additionally archived at archive.today

 
Boarding schools in New Hampshire
Private high schools in New Hampshire
Preparatory schools in New Hampshire
Educational institutions established in 1781
1781 establishments in New Hampshire
Co-educational boarding schools
Schools in Rockingham County, New Hampshire
Exeter, New Hampshire
Six Schools League
Phillips family (New England)